Anton Banko (August 26, 1927 - May 16, 1986) was a Slovenian inventor and engineer who is best known for designing the first phacoemulsifier.

Banko established Surgical Design Corporation in New York in 1968 which produced a variety of successful phacoemulsification machines that are used worldwide.

Banko also developed  patents used in ocular surgery including an instrument for vitrectomy that he patented in 1969.  After that, a combined Mackool/Heslin Ocusystem machine was designed

References

Yugoslav engineers
1927 births
1986 deaths
Slovenian engineers